Haemophilus virus HP2 is a virus of the family Myoviridae, genus Hpunavirus.

References 

Myoviridae